A NewCo or Newco is a term used to describe a corporate spin-off, startup, or subsidiary company before they are assigned a final name, or to proposed merged companies to distinguish the to-be-formed combined entity with an existing company involved in the merger which may have the same (or a similar) name. In a handful of cases the new company may retain the name "Newco".

The term can also be used to describe a company that was created to replace its predecessor, which ceased to exist for reasons such as financial issues: the creation of a NewCo to continue the existence of Rangers F.C. was a notable example.

Examples 
 IBM GTS - Managed Infrastructure Services → Kyndryl
 3M’s data storage business (spun off in 1996) → Imation (later renamed GlassBridge in 2017)
 Abbott Laboratories pharmaceutical division → AbbVie
 Atlas Copco Mining and Rock Excavation Technique business area → Epiroc
 AT&T computer hardware subsidiary → NCR
 Bayer chemicals operations → Lanxess
 BP petrochemicals group → Innovene
 Ford Motor Company vehicle components division → Visteon
 Hewlett-Packard instrumentation division → Agilent Technologies
 Karstadt Warenhaus AG merging with Quelle AG → Arcandor
 Northwest Airlines regional operations → Compass Airlines
 Merged entity of NBC Universal & Comcast programming assets→ NBCUniversal
 RAG Beteiligungs-AG (Degussa, Steag, Immobilien AG → Evonik Industries
 The Rangers Football Club plc (liquidated in 2012) → Sevco Scotland Ltd (later renamed The Rangers Football Club Ltd)
 Siemens semiconductor subsidiary → Infineon
 Barnes & Noble's Nook subsidiary → Nook Media

 DaimlerChrysler MTU Friedrichshafen division → Tognum (later acquired by Rolls-Royce plc and now the Rolls-Royce Power Systems subsidiary)
 Merged entity of T-Mobile USA and MetroPCS → corporate name of T-Mobile US; kept both T-Mobile and MetroPCS (later modified to Metro by T-Mobile) brands

See also 
 Advent corporation (placeholder)
 Placeholder name#Companies and organizations

References 

Business terms